Jhantipahari High School is a Higher secondary school of Bankura district, India.  It was established in 1945. This school is affiliated under two Boards. It is affiliated to West Bengal Board of Secondary Education for Madhyamik(10th) and to West Bengal Council of Higher Secondary Education for Higher Secondary.

It offers grades from class V to class XII. For Grade V to Grade X, it is only for Boys. But both Boys and Girls are there in Grade XI and XII.

Location
It is situated next to Jhantipahari Bus Stand and around one and half Kilometer away from Jhantipahari Railway Station.

References

High schools and secondary schools in West Bengal
Schools in Bankura district
Educational institutions established in 1945
1945 establishments in India